This is a list of members of the House of Commons of Canada in the 39th Parliament of Canada (April 3, 2006 to September 7, 2008).

Bold text denotes cabinet ministers (two cabinet members, Senator Michael Fortier and Senator Marjory LeBreton are not members of the House).
Italic text denotes party leaders

Members

Newfoundland and Labrador

Nova Scotia

Prince Edward Island

New Brunswick

Quebec

 Member since swearing-in date of by-election.
 Leader since December 2, 2006.

Ontario

 Elected as a Conservative.
 Member since December 7, 2006 (elected on November 27 by-election).
 Elected as a Liberal.
 Elected as a Liberal.
 Party leader until December 2, 2006.
 Elected in a March 17, 2008 by-election.
 Cabinet minister until November 27, 2006.
 Elected in a March 17, 2008 by-election.
 Cabinet minister since November 27, 2006.

Manitoba

Saskatchewan

 Elected in a March 17, 2008 by-election.

Alberta

British Columbia

 Elected as a Liberal.
 Elected in a March 17, 2008 by-election.
 Elected as a Liberal; on August 30, 2008, Wilson declared that he would sit as Canada's first Green Member of Parliament.

The North

Changes since election

Changes in membership

See also
List of senators in the 39th Parliament of Canada
Women in the 39th Canadian Parliament

References

House Members Of The 39th Parliament Of Canada, List Of
39th